Black Death is the only studio album by American heavy metal band Black Death, released in 1984 by Auburn Records.

Critical reception
In his review of the official 2017 reissue for Metal Temple, Lior Stein gave a 7/10 rating, saying that “(i)n comparison to the original recording from 1984…there is a margin of improvement in this reissue in terms of the digital remastering.” Stein deemed the songwriting “solid, not what you would call over the top, not aiming to be catchy, which is rather in their benefit but enough to be satisfied with” before concluding that the album “is still a relic, a collector’s must and earns the respects of the contemporary Metal scene.” Kerrang! ranked the third track, “When Tears Run Red (From Love Lost Yesterday)”, at number 2 on their list of “The 10 Greatest Metal Songs by African-American Artists”.

Tracklist
Disc 1 (12”)

Disc 2 (7”)

Personnel

Black Death
Siki Spacek – vocals, guitar
Greg Hicks – guitar
Darrell Harris – bass
Phil Bullard – drums

Production
Bob Surgent and Black Death — producer
Bill Peter — executive producer
Eric Broviak, assisted by Dawn Holt – engineering
Jack Skinner — mastering

Design
Anastasia Pantsios— cover photography
Paula Grooms — cover layout
Bob and Lisa Surgent – logo design

References

External links
 
Black Death at Encyclopaedia Metallum
1984 debut albums